Farooq Naeem FRCPsych, Ph.D. is known in global mental health for his pioneering work on cultural adaptation of cognitive behaviour therapy. He is also the founder of PACT (Pakistan Association of Cognitive Therapists). He is currently a professor of psychiatry at the University of Toronto, Toronto, Canada.

Education
Farooq Naeem received his psychiatric training in the Merseyside training scheme, Liverpool, England. He later completed his MSc in research methods and Ph.D. from the University of Southampton, England. He completed his senior registrar training in Wessex. He is also a Cognitive Behaviour Therapist. In addition to CBT for common mental health disorders as he also received training in CBT for psychosis.

Career and research work
Farooq's primary work is in global mental health. Farooq pioneered techniques for culturally adapting CBT. The model was initially presented as Southampton Adaptation Framework and has evolved over the years. These techniques were used to adapt CBT for various common and severe mental health problems in South Asia, North Africa, the Middle East and China. Currently, the model is being used to adapt CBT for South Asians in Canada. More than 30 RCTs have used the adaptation methodology for a variety of problems and in different settings.  

His Ph.D. project focused on culturally adapting CBT for clients from Non-Western cultures. He also developed culturally adapted self-help manuals that have been tested through RCTs.

His model of adaptation of CBT has been used to adapt DBT for those with learning disabilities in Kingston, Ontario. He recently received funding from Health Canada to adapt CBT for South Asians in Canada.

His most significant contribution in implementation science is establishing a national organization to train and accredit CBT therapists, deliver therapy, promote research and educate the general public Pakistan Association of Cognitive Therapists (PACT). Founded in 2008.

He chairs a special interest group for the WPA (World Psychiatric Association), his collaborations include work with high-calibre institutes and professionals in England, the US, China, Kenya, Nigeria, the Middle East and South Asia. He also works with an international genetic consortium that includes global leaders in genetics from Kings College, London, UK, University of Toronto, Canada and SUNY-Downstate Health Sciences University, New York, USA.   

During his stay at Queens University, Canada, he evaluated the first CBTp based guided self-help for psychosis that he developed.

He established a low-intensity CBT service, "CBT Lite," at a community organization (AMHS-KFLA) in Kingston, Ontario. The service delivery model incorporated measurement of change in psychopathology and disability. He also supported the Structured Psychotherapy Program at the Centre for Addiction and Mental Health to develop a structured psychotherapy training program curriculum. In addition, he has advised Health Quality Ontario on developing Health Technology Assessments for CBT for psychosis and internet-delivered CBT. He is also a member of the Mental Health Commission of Canada's "think tank" to improve psychotherapies outcomes.

Selected publications 
Weihui Li, Li Zhang, Xuerong Luo, Bangshan Liu, Zhipeng Liu, Fang Lin, Zhiling Liu, YuhuanXie, Melissa Hudson, Shanaya Rathod, David Kingdon, Nusrat Husain, Xudong Liu, Muhammad Ayub, Farooq Naeem. "A qualitative study to explore views of patients', carers' and mental health professionals to inform cultural adaptation of CBT for psychosis (CBTp) in China". BMC Psychiatry. 2017 April 8; 17(1):131. . Impact Factor 2.576.  
Chris Trimmer, Richard Tyo, Farooq Naeem. "Cognitive Behavioural Therapy-Based Music (CBT-Music) Group for Symptoms of Anxiety and Depression". Canadian Journal of Community Mental Health. 2016 October 26; 35 (2)83-87. . Impact Factor 0.57. 
Farooq Naeem, Rupy Johal, Claire McKenna, Shanaya Rathod, Muhammad Ayub, Tania Lecomte, Nusrat Husain, David Kingdon, Saeed Farooq. "Cognitive Behavior Therapy for psychosis based Guided Self-help (CBTp-GSH)" delivered by frontline mental health professionals: Results of a feasibility study. Schizophrenia Research. 2016 March 9; 173(1-2):69-74. . Impact Factor 4.748.
Farooq Naeem, Muhammad Ayub, Muhammad Gobbi, David Kingdon. "Development of Southampton Adaptation Framework for CBT (SAF-CBT): a framework for adaptation of CBT in non-western culture". Journal of the Pakistan Psychiatric Society. 2009; 6(2): 79–84. 
Farooq Naeem, Tariq Munshi, David Gratzer, David Rodie, Muhammad Irfan, Sanjay Rao, Nusrat Husain, Saeed Farooq, Marcos Sanches, Muhammad Ayub, Tania Lecomte: "Video intervention for the psychiatric waiting room: a proof-of-concept randomized controlled trial of RESOLVE (Relaxation Exercise, SOLVing problem and cognitive Errors)". BJPsych Open 09/2019; 5(5).,

Awards and honours
July 2021: Awarded the Lifetime achievement award by the International Network on Personal Meaning, Vancouver, Canada.
May 2020: Awarded Academic Excellence in Psychotherapy award Department of Psychiatry, University of Toronto, Toronto. 
April 2020: Nominated Clinician of the year by Centre for Addiction and Mental Health, Toronto, Canada.

References

External links 

Academic staff of the University of Toronto
1965 births
Living people